Aleksandr Aleksandrovich Karelin (born 19 September 1967) is a Russian politician and retired athlete.

Karelin competed in Greco-Roman wrestling, representing the Soviet Union and Russia between 1987 and 2000. Nicknamed the "Russian Bear", "Russian King Kong", "Alexander the Great" and "The Experiment", he is widely considered to be the greatest Greco-Roman wrestler of all time. Karelin won gold medals at the 1988, 1992 and 1996 Olympic Games under a different flag each time (Soviet Union, Unified Team and Russia respectively), and a silver medal at the 2000 Olympic Games. His wrestling record is 887 wins and two losses, both by a single point. Prior to his last match versus Rulon Gardner in September 2000, a point had not been scored on him within the previous six years. He went undefeated in the world championships, having never lost a match. Karelin was the national flag bearer at three consecutive Olympics: in 1988 for the Soviet Union, in 1992 for the Unified Team, and in 1996 for Russia.

Karelin entered politics in 1999, being elected a deputy of the State Duma that year. He sat in the Duma through various convocations until 2020, when he entered the Federation Council as a senator.

Wrestling career
Karelin was born as a  baby. He began training in 1981, under Viktor Kuznetsov, who remained his coach through his entire career. Before that he tried boxing, weightlifting, volleyball, basketball, skiing and swimming, excelling in all the sports he tried. In 1985 he came to an international competition and won a junior world title. He had his first loss (score 0–1) at the USSR championships in 1987, to the reigning Russian and European champion Igor Rostorotsky; he defeated Rostorotsky at the next USSR championships while recovering from a flu and a recent concussion. He would go on to become a 13-time champion of the USSR, CIS, and Russia from 1988 to 2000.

In the 1988 Olympic final Karelin came close to losing to Rangel Gerovski, but with 50 seconds left managed to execute his signature Karelin Lift and won. With his win, Karelin became the youngest Greco-Roman wrestler to become an Olympic champion at super heavyweight (130 kg) at the age of 21 years and two days. At the 1996 Summer Olympic Games in Atlanta, Karelin faced American Matt Ghaffari for the gold medal. Karelin had come off a shoulder surgery and looked vulnerable against a strong Ghaffari, who was able to repel Karelin's efforts to lift and slam him, forcing Karelin to use all of his skill and experience to defend a 1–0 lead.

After going 13 years undefeated in international competition and six years without giving up a point, he lost 0–1 to Rulon Gardner of the United States in the final of the Sydney Olympics. His loss in the final of the Sydney Olympics was his first and only international loss, having previously been unbeaten throughout his international career. 
Karelin retired from competitions in 2000.

Training style
Karelin was revered for his extraordinary strength and unprecedented success in international competition. He competed in the heaviest weight class of his day, 130 kg (286 lb). His coach was at first skeptical about a big but undeveloped boy, yet he accepted Karelin and motivated him for hard training, both in wrestling technique and physical strength. As a result, over the years Karelin progressed from 0 to 42 pull-ups. His conditioning and quickness combined with his dominance of the sport, led to him being known as "The Experiment". When asked why he thought he was called that (referring to a biased opinion on his alleged PED use), Karelin noted that: "No one can completely believe that I am natural. The most important drug is to train like a madman – really like a madman. The people who accuse me are those who have never trained once in their life like I train every day of my life." 

Karelin's daily training drills included hours of rowing and long runs through Taiga forest often with a large log on his back. He favored the overhead press and also used standard 2-pood kettlebells for arm exercises at a daily weight routine. He is said to have clean and pressed . He would routinely bench press  as part of his workout. According to Tuomo Karila, a Finnish wrestler, while following Karelin's training routine, he observed that Karelin was able to do around 50 chin-ups within a minute. Despite his large physique, he was flexible and agile enough to do backflips and splits. When asked about his toughest opponent, Karelin instantly replied: "My refrigerator," referring to the time for which he bear hugged his refrigerator, weighing over 500lbs, and carried it up through eight flights of stairs of his hometown 9-storied apartment building. Karelin also took part in a strongman competition, that being the 1991 European Hercules, placing 8th.

Wrestling style

Karelin was famous for his reverse body lift, the Karelin Lift, where facing the opponent who was lying flat on the mat to keep from being thrown, Karelin hoisted his opponents into the air and slammed them violently to the mat. This devastatingly effective maneuver, when properly executed, awarded Karelin 5 points per throw, the maximum awarded in Greco-Roman wrestling. The throw had long been in use by lighter wrestlers but not by heavyweights – because of the immense strength required to raise, spin and hit the mat with a 560+ lbs combined weight of both athletes (280+ of which resist desperately to the performed maneuver). Karelin's ability to perform this throw against elite opponents weighing as much as 130 kg amazed other participants and observers of the sport. Furthermore, his incredible grip strength was described as being similar to that of "an anaconda", which allowed him to hold down his opponents and prevent them from escaping from his grasp.

Injuries
Like most top wrestlers, Karelin had a number of severe injuries through his career. He credits his fast recoveries to Valery Okhapkin, physician of the national wrestling team, and claims that Okhapkin extended his competition lifetime by several years.

At the age of 15 Karelin broke his leg while training; having learned about this accident his mother burned his wrestling uniform and forbade him to wrestle. Since then he broke his arms twice and ribs thirteen times. Around January 1988 he had a serious concussion, and doctors considered removing him from the 1988 Olympic team. Karelin won the 1993 World Championships despite breaking two ribs in the opening bout against Matt Ghaffari. At the 1996 European Championships in Budapest, he had torn the right pectoralis major muscle so badly that doctors predicted he would not be able to use his right hand for several months. Karelin won the Championships, but had to be urgently operated on in Budapest. He recovered within three months to compete at the 1996 Olympics. As many other wrestlers, Karelin has a bit tongue (which was and still is a very frequent wrestling injury before the advent of contemporary chin-tight wrestling headgear), which affects his pronunciation and speech, limiting r-containing words usage. And as many other wrestlers he has multiple ear cartilage injuries of both ears.

International competition record

|-
!  Res.
!  Opponent
!  Method
!  Time/Score
!  Date
!  Event
!  Location
|-
! style=background:white colspan=7 |
|-
|Loss
|align=left| Rulon Gardner
|style="font-size:88%"|Decision
|style="font-size:88%"|0–1
|style="font-size:88%"|2000-09-25
|rowspan=5 style="text-align:center; font-size:88%"|2000 Olympic Games
|rowspan=5 style="text-align:center; font-size:88%"| Sydney
|-
|Win
|align=left| Dmitry Debelka
|style="font-size:88%"|Decision
|style="font-size:88%"|3–0
|style="font-size:88%"|2000-09-25
|-
|Win
|align=left| Georgiy Saldadze
|style="font-size:88%"|Decision
|style="font-size:88%"|4–0
|style="font-size:88%"|2000-09-25
|-
|Win
|align=left| Mihály Deák-Bárdos
|style="font-size:88%"|Decision
|style="font-size:88%"|3–0
|style="font-size:88%"|2000-09-25
|-
|Win
|align=left| Sergei Mureiko
|style="font-size:88%"|Decision
|style="font-size:88%"|3–0
|style="font-size:88%"|2000-09-25
|-
! style=background:white colspan=7 |
|-
|Win
|align=left| Héctor Milián
|style="font-size:88%"|Decision
|style="font-size:88%"|3–0
|style="font-size:88%"|1999-09-23
|rowspan=6 style="text-align:center; font-size:88%"|1999 World Wrestling Championships
|rowspan=6 style="text-align:center; font-size:88%"| Athens
|-
|Win
|align=left| Sergei Mureiko
|style="font-size:88%"|Decision
|style="font-size:88%"|0–0
|style="font-size:88%"|1999-09-23
|-
|Win
|align=left| Georgiy Saldadze
|style="font-size:88%"|Decision
|style="font-size:88%"|3–0
|style="font-size:88%"|1999-09-23
|-
|Win
|align=left| Eddy Bengtsson
|style="font-size:88%"|Tech Fall
|style="font-size:88%"|
|style="font-size:88%"|1999-09-23
|-
|Win
|align=left| Giuseppe Giunta
|style="font-size:88%"|Tech Fall
|style="font-size:88%"|
|style="font-size:88%"|1999-09-23
|-
|Win
|align=left| Mindaugas Mizgaitis
|style="font-size:88%"|Tech Fall
|style="font-size:88%"|
|style="font-size:88%"|1999-09-23
|-
! style=background:white colspan=7 |
|-
|Win
|align=left| Matt Ghaffari
|style="font-size:88%"|Decision
|style="font-size:88%"|8–0
|style="font-size:88%"|1998-08-27
|rowspan=4 style="text-align:center; font-size:88%"|1998 World Wrestling Championships
|rowspan=4 style="text-align:center; font-size:88%"| Gävle
|-
|Win
|align=left| Georgiy Saldadze
|style="font-size:88%"|Decision
|style="font-size:88%"|4–0
|style="font-size:88%"|1998-08-27
|-
|Win
|align=left| Yuri Evseichik
|style="font-size:88%"|Decision
|style="font-size:88%"|8–0
|style="font-size:88%"|1998-08-27
|-
|Win
|align=left| Juha Ahokas
|style="font-size:88%"|Fall
|style="font-size:88%"|
|style="font-size:88%"|1998-08-27
|-
! style=background:white colspan=7 |
|-
|Win
|align=left| Mihály Deák-Bárdos
|style="font-size:88%"|Decision
|style="font-size:88%"|11–0
|style="font-size:88%"|1997-09-10
|rowspan=4 style="text-align:center; font-size:88%"|1997 World Wrestling Championships
|rowspan=4 style="text-align:center; font-size:88%"| Wroclaw
|-
|Win
|align=left| Rulon Gardner
|style="font-size:88%"|Decision
|style="font-size:88%"|6–0
|style="font-size:88%"|1997-09-10
|-
|Win
|align=left| Sergei Mureiko
|style="font-size:88%"|Decision
|style="font-size:88%"|2–0
|style="font-size:88%"|1997-09-10
|-
|Win
|align=left| Young-Jin Yang
|style="font-size:88%"|Decision
|style="font-size:88%"|6–0
|style="font-size:88%"|1997-09-10
|-
! style=background:white colspan=7 |
|-
|Win
|align=left| Matt Ghaffari
|style="font-size:88%"|Decision
|style="font-size:88%"|1–0
|style="font-size:88%"|1996-07-22
|rowspan=5 style="text-align:center; font-size:88%"|1996 Olympic Games
|rowspan=5 style="text-align:center; font-size:88%"| Atlanta, Georgia
|-
|Win
|align=left| Panagiotis Poikilidis
|style="font-size:88%"|Fall
|style="font-size:88%"|
|style="font-size:88%"|1996-07-21
|-
|Win
|align=left| Juha Ahokas
|style="font-size:88%"|Fall
|style="font-size:88%"|
|style="font-size:88%"|1996-07-21
|-
|Win
|align=left| Sergei Mureiko
|style="font-size:88%"|Decision
|style="font-size:88%"|2–0
|style="font-size:88%"|1996-07-21
|-
|Win
|align=left| Omrane Ayari
|style="font-size:88%"|Decision
|style="font-size:88%"|10–0
|style="font-size:88%"|1996-07-21
|-
! style=background:white colspan=7 |
|-
|Win
|align=left| Tomas Johansson
|style="font-size:88%"|Fall
|style="font-size:88%"|
|style="font-size:88%"|1992-07-29
|rowspan=5 style="text-align:center; font-size:88%"|1992 Olympic Games
|rowspan=5 style="text-align:center; font-size:88%"| Barcelona
|-
|Win
|align=left| Ioan Grigoraş
|style="font-size:88%"|Fall
|style="font-size:88%"|
|style="font-size:88%"|1992-07-27
|-
|Win
|align=left| Juha Ahokas
|style="font-size:88%"|Decision
|style="font-size:88%"|8–1
|style="font-size:88%"|1992-07-27
|-
|Win
|align=left| Cándido Mesa
|style="font-size:88%"|Fall
|style="font-size:88%"|
|style="font-size:88%"|1992-07-27
|-
|Win
|align=left| Andy Borodow
|style="font-size:88%"|Fall
|style="font-size:88%"|
|style="font-size:88%"|1992-07-27
|-
! style=background:white colspan=7 |
|-
|Win
|align=left| László Klauz
|style="font-size:88%"|Decision
|style="font-size:88%"|7–0
|style="font-size:88%"|1989-08-26
|rowspan=2 style="text-align:center; font-size:88%"|1989 World Wrestling Championships
|rowspan=2 style="text-align:center; font-size:88%"| Martigny
|-
|Win
|align=left| Craig Pittman
|style="font-size:88%"|Fall
|style="font-size:88%"|3:16
|style="font-size:88%"|1989-08-24
|-
! style=background:white colspan=7 |
|-
|Win
|align=left| Rangel Gerovski
|style="font-size:88%"|Decision
|style="font-size:88%"|5–3
|style="font-size:88%"|1988-09-22
|rowspan=5 style="text-align:center; font-size:88%"|1988 Olympic Games
|rowspan=5 style="text-align:center; font-size:88%"| Seoul
|-
|Win
|align=left| Duane Koslowski
|style="font-size:88%"|Tech Fall
|style="font-size:88%"|
|style="font-size:88%"|1988-09-20
|-
|Win
|align=left| Alexander Neumüller
|style="font-size:88%"|Fall
|style="font-size:88%"|
|style="font-size:88%"|1988-09-20
|-
|Win
|align=left| László Klauz
|style="font-size:88%"|Passivity
|style="font-size:88%"|
|style="font-size:88%"|1988-09-20
|-
|Win
|align=left| Tomas Johansson
|style="font-size:88%"|Decision
|style="font-size:88%"|5–0
|style="font-size:88%"|1988-09-20
|-
! style=background:white colspan=7 |
|-
|Win
|align=left| Jeff Blatnick
|style="font-size:88%"|DQ
|style="font-size:88%"|13–0
|style="font-size:88%"|1987-10-15
|rowspan=4 style="text-align:center; font-size:88%"|1987 Wrestling World Cup
|rowspan=4 style="text-align:center; font-size:88%"| Albany, New York
|-
|Win
|align=left| 
|style="font-size:88%"|Walkover
|style="font-size:88%"|
|style="font-size:88%"|1987-10-15
|-
|Win
|align=left| Juan Poulot
|style="font-size:88%"|Fall
|style="font-size:88%"|1:26
|style="font-size:88%"|1987-10-14
|-
|Win
|align=left| Kenichi Mikosawa
|style="font-size:88%"|
|style="font-size:88%"|
|style="font-size:88%"|1987-10-14

Mixed martial arts
On 21 February 1999 Karelin defeated Akira Maeda in a shoot wrestling contest put on by RINGS that drew a gate of over $1 million. The match gained widespread media coverage, including mentions in The New York Times and Sports Illustrated. The match took place in the Maeda-owned professional wrestling organization RINGS. Though widely considered to have been a shoot style wrestling contest, the match is counted as an official mixed martial arts (MMA) match in Sherdog's record database.

|-
| Win
| align=center| 1–0
| Akira Maeda
| Decision (Unanimous)
| Rings: Final Capture
| 
| align=center| 3
| align=center| 5:00
| Japan
|

Political career

Between 1995 and 1999 Karelin served with the Russian tax police and retired in the rank of colonel.  Upon invitation from Vladimir Putin, in 1999 he began his political career. He joined the United Russia party and was elected to the State Duma as a representative of Novosibirsk Oblast in 1999 and 2003. In 2007 he was elected to the Duma as a representative of Stavropol Krai. He was a member of Duma's committee on international affairs. In 2017, he entered the PutinTeam, a social movement aimed at promoting Vladimir Putin's policies. 

In 2020 Karelin was appointed as senator from the Legislative Assembly of Novosibirsk Oblast in the Federation Council. He took up the post on 25 September 2020, and is a member of the council's committee on International Affairs.

Personal life
Karelin graduated from the Novosibirsk Institute of Transportation in 1985, followed by the Siberian Academy of Physical Culture, a military school of the Soviet Ministry of Internal Affairs (MVD USSR) and the Saint Petersburg University of MVD USSR. In 1998 he defended a PhD and in 2002 a habilitation in sport-related pedagogy; he also holds a degree in law. His PhD is titled: "Methods of execution of suplex throw counters", and "Integral training system for top-level wrestlers".

Karelin's father was a truck driver and an amateur boxer. Karelin is married to Olga, they have two sons, Denis and Ivan, and one daughter, Vasilisa. Denis (born c. 1986) tried wrestling, but changed it for car racing. Ivan (born 1994) is coached by Kuznetsov and competes in the Greco-Roman superheavyweight division. Vasilisa (born c. 1999) is a rhythmic gymnast.

Karelin is an Orthodox Christian.

While serving in the Internal Troops, he competed in sambo, and became a sambo champion.

Legacy and awards
Karelin was named as the greatest Greco-Roman wrestler of the 20th century by the International Federation of Associated Wrestling Styles (FILA) and one of the class of ten inaugural inductees into the FILA International Wrestling Hall of Fame in 2003. He was also included in the 25 best world athletes of the 20th century. Since 1992, an annual wrestling competition is held in Novosibirsk in his honor.

Karelin was named a Hero of the Russian Federation in 1997 and awarded the Order of Friendship of Peoples (1989), Order of Honour (2001) and Order "For Merit to the Fatherland" IV class (2008). He was awarded the Serbian Order of Saint Sava. In 2017, he was awarded the Order "For Merit to the Republic of Dagestan". He was also named a Merited Master of Sports of the USSR (1988).

He is a hidden playable character in the Japan-only, AKI Corporation-created, Nintendo 64 video game: Virtual Pro Wrestling 2.

Notes

References

External links

 Official personal web-site
 
 

1967 births
Living people
Sportspeople from Novosibirsk
Soviet male sport wrestlers
Russian male sport wrestlers
Olympic wrestlers of Russia
Olympic wrestlers of the Unified Team
Olympic wrestlers of the Soviet Union
Olympic gold medalists for the Soviet Union
Olympic gold medalists for the Unified Team
Wrestlers at the 1988 Summer Olympics
Wrestlers at the 1992 Summer Olympics
Wrestlers at the 1996 Summer Olympics
Wrestlers at the 2000 Summer Olympics
Olympic gold medalists for Russia
Olympic silver medalists for Russia
Olympic medalists in wrestling
Medalists at the 2000 Summer Olympics
Medalists at the 1996 Summer Olympics
Medalists at the 1992 Summer Olympics
Medalists at the 1988 Summer Olympics
World Wrestling Championships medalists
Russian sportsperson-politicians
Heroes of the Russian Federation
Recipients of the Order of St. Sava
United Russia politicians
21st-century Russian politicians
European Wrestling Championships medalists
Third convocation members of the State Duma (Russian Federation)
Fourth convocation members of the State Duma (Russian Federation)
Fifth convocation members of the State Duma (Russian Federation)
Sixth convocation members of the State Duma (Russian Federation)
Seventh convocation members of the State Duma (Russian Federation)
Members of the Federation Council of Russia (after 2000)
Honoured Masters of Sport of the USSR
Russian sambo practitioners
Russian male professional wrestlers